Bomsori Kim (born December 13, 1989) is a South Korean classical violinist. She performs as a recitalist and as a soloist with leading orchestras and conductors.

As a violinist, Bomsori has won prizes at ten international violin competitions, including the Tchaikovsky, Queen Elisabeth, ARD, Sibelius, Montreal, Sendai, Wieniawski, Joachim, China (Qingdao), and Schoenfeld. She has recorded for the major record labels such as Deutsche Grammophon and Warner Classics. She currently plays on the 1774 J.B. Guadagnini Turin, on loan to her from Kumho Asiana Cultural Foundation.

Early life and education 
Bomsori was born in Daegu, South Korea, on December 13, 1989. She first started playing the violin at the age of 5. She moved to Seoul to attend Yewon Arts School.

Bomsori earned a Bachelor's degree at Seoul National University, studied with Young Uck Kim, and obtained a Master’s degree and Artist Diploma at The Juilliard School under Sylvia Rosenberg and Ronald Copes as a full-scholarship recipient.

Musical career 

As a soloist, she has appeared at numerous venues worldwide, such as Carnegie Hall, Lincoln Center David Geffen Hall, and Alice Tully Hall in New York, Musikverein Golden Hall in Vienna, Tchaikovsky Hall in Moscow, Philharmonia Hall in St. Petersburg, Slovak Radio Concert Hall in Bratislava, Finlandia Hall in Helsinki, Herkulessaal and Prinzregententheater in Munich, Berlin Philharmonic Hall and Konzerthaus in Berlin, Warsaw Philharmonic Hall in Warsaw, NOSPR Hall in Katowice, Rudolfinum and Smetana Hall in Prague, Tonhalle in Zürich, Opera City Hall and Suntory Hall in Tokyo, and Seoul Arts Center Concert Hall.

Bomsori has performed with numerous orchestras, such as the New York Philharmonic, Bayerischer Rundfunk Symphony Orchestra, Moscow Symphony Orchestra, Montreal Symphony Orchestra, National Orchestra of Belgium, Zurich Chamber Orchestra, Warsaw National Philharmonic Orchestra, and NDR Radiophilharmonie, amongst others.

Bomsori has appeared at numerous festivals, such as the Lucerne Festival, Rheingau Musik Festival, Heidelberger Frühling, Gstaad Festival, Dvořák Festival (Rudolfinum in Prague). In 2019, she was Artist-soloist-in-residence at Poznań Philharmonic Orchestra and Artist-in-residence at Iserlohn Musik Festival in Germany.

Discography 
In 2017, Warner Classics released Bomsori’s debut album Wieniawski/Shostakovich with maestro Jacek Kaspszyk and the Warsaw Philharmonic Orchestra, featuring Wieniawski's Violin Concerto No. 2 and Shostakovich's Violin Concerto No. 1. The BBC Music Magazine praised her playing as with "centred tone and a strong rhythmic thrust", and The Strad magazine opined "I can't remember when I last enjoyed this concerto so much." In 2018, the album was nominated for the Frederyk Music Award in the category Album of the Year – Orchestral Music.

In 2019, Deutsche Grammophon released her second album Faure, Debussy, Szymanowski, Chopin with pianist Rafał Blechacz. The Gramophone Magazine praised her playing as "direct and ardent, with mahogany-hued lower registers contrasting with sweetly ringing, singing upper ones". In 2020, she won her first Frederyk Music Award for the Best Polish Album Abroad.

Awards and recognitions 
 2010 – Sendai International Music Competition – Fourth Prize, Audience Prize
 2010 – International Jean Sibelius Violin Competition – Laureate
 2011 – China International Violin Competition (Qingdao) – First Prize, Classical Music Prize, "Lin Yaoji" Prize for Outstanding Artist
 2012 – International Joseph Joachim Violin Competition – Fifth Prize
 2013 – ARD International Music Competition Munich – Top Prize, Special Prize for the Commissioned Piece
 2013 – Sendai International Music Competition – Fifth Prize
 2015 – Queen Elisabeth Competition – Laureate
 2015 – International Tchaikovsky Competition – Fifth Prize
 2016 – Montreal International Musical Competition – Second Prize, Radio Canada People’s Choice Prize
 2016 – Schoenfeld International String Competition – Second Prize
 2016 – Henryk Wieniawski Violin Competition – Second Prize, Critic’s Prize, nine additional Special Prizes
 2018 – Today’s Young Artist Award held by Korean Ministry of Culture, Sports, and Tourism
 2018 – The Album of the Year Orchestral Music (Nominated) – Frederyk Music Award
 2018 – Forbes Korea 30 under 30
 2019 – Young Artist Award held by Korean Music Association
 2020 – G.rium Artist Award held by SK Gas
 2020 – The Best Polish Album Abroad – Frederyk Music Award

References

External links 

Women classical violinists
South Korean classical violinists
Seoul Arts High School alumni
Juilliard School alumni
Seoul National University alumni
1989 births
Living people
21st-century women musicians
21st-century classical violinists
21st-century South Korean musicians
People from Daegu